is a passenger railway station in the city of Isumi, Chiba Prefecture, Japan, operated by the third-sector railway operator Isumi Railway.

Lines
Nittano Station is served by the Isumi Line, and lies 7.4 kilometers from the eastern terminus of the line at Ōhara.

Station layout
The station consists of a simple side platform serving bidirectional traffic, with a three-sided rain shelter built onto the platform. The station is unattended.

Platforms

Adjacent stations

History
Nittano Station opened on June 20, 1960 as a station on the Japanese National Railways (JNR). With the division and privatization of the Japan National Railways on April 1, 1987, the station was acquired by the East Japan Railway Company. On March 24, 1988, the Kihara Line became the Isumi Railroad Isumi Line.

Passenger statistics
In fiscal 2018, the station was used by an average of 17 passengers daily.

Surrounding area

See also
 List of railway stations in Japan

References

External links

  Isumi Railway Company home page

Railway stations in Japan opened in 1960
Railway stations in Chiba Prefecture
Isumi Line
Isumi